in Tokyo, Japan is a Japanese academic and author. Emeritus Professor at Keio University since 2009, he is an authority on medieval English literature and medieval English manuscript studies and a collector of antiquarian books.

As Director of Keio University's Humanities Media Interface Project (HUMI) he has led the digital documentation, facsimile reproduction, and distribution of many rare medieval books and manuscripts including the Gutenberg Bible and Chaucer's Canterbury Tales.

Early life and education 
Takamiya was born in Tokyo in 1944. He graduated from Keio University with a BA in Economics in 1966 and subsequently studied at the same university for both a BA and MA in English Literature, graduating in 1968 and 1970 respectively.

Academic research and professional positions 
Under Takamiya's direction, the HUMI team at Keio University has made digital reproductions of sixteen sets of the Gutenberg Bible at seven institutions, including in 2000, both full-text facsimiles held in the collection of the British Library. The high resolution images have facilitated comparative bibliographical research on early movable type printing methods and are available for public access on the respective library websites.

Since 1986 Takamiya has been a Fellow of the Society of Antiquaries of London. Professor Takamiya has been awarded honorary degrees by the University of Sheffield (1998) and the University of Glasgow (2011).

From 2000 to 2004 Takamiya served as a trustee of the New Chaucer Society.

In 2004 a festschrift was published in his honor: The Medieval Book and a Modern Collector: essays in honour of Toshiyuki Takamiya. Cambridge: D. S. Brewer .

Loan to the Beinecke Library 
In 2013 Takamiya deposited on long term loan his private collection of rare medieval books and manuscripts at Yale University's Beinecke Rare Book & Manuscript Library. Assembled over 40 years, the collection includes 51 items, including three copies of Chaucer's Canterbury Tales, a copy of Chaucer's A Treatise on the Astrolabe, and several Wycliffe's Bibles.

References

External links
 Interviewed by Alan Macfarlane 19 October 2009 (video)

1944 births
Living people
Academic staff of Keio University
Academics of the University of Glasgow
Fellows of the Society of Antiquaries of London
English literature academics